Hunaina Al-Mughairy (born October 13, 1948) was the ambassador of the Sultanate of Oman to the United States from 2005 to 2020. During the time she spent at New York University, she earned a bachelor of arts and a master's degree in economics.

She is the first women to be nominated Ambassador of Oman to Washington.

She was elected member of the Cosmos Club of Washington DC.

See also 
 Embassy of Oman

References 

1948 births
Living people
Ambassadors of Oman to the United States
American Ibadi Muslims
People from Dar es Salaam